Nicolae Bretan was a twentieth century Romanian composer. This list of compositions by Nicolae Bretan includes his operatic work, lieder, choral music and orchestral works.

Stage works 

 Luceafărul (The Evening Star), opera, 1 act (Bretan, after Mihai Eminescu; first performance: Cluj, Romanian Opera, 2 February 1921)
 Golem, opera, 1 act (Bretan, after ; first performance: Cluj, Hungarian Theatre, 23 December 1924)
 Horia, opera, 3 acts (Bretan, after ; first performance: Cluj, Romanian Opera, 24 January 1937)
 Arald (Harald), opera, 1 act (Bretan, after Eminescu; first performance: Iași, Romanian Opera, 12 May 1982)
 Eroii de la Rovine (The Heroes of Rovine), opera, 1 act (Bretan, after Eminescu; first performance: Cluj, Romanian Opera, 24 January 1935)
 A Különös Széder-Est (The Mysterious Seder), mystery play (texts from the Haggadah, first performance: Bethesda, Bradley Hills Presbyterian Church, 8 September 1974)

Lieder

Sacred music 
 Pleacă, Domane, urechea ta (from Psalm 50) for voice and piano, 1904
 Tatăl nostru (Our Father) for voice and piano, 1927
 Născătoare de Dumnezeu (Ave Maria) for voice and piano, 1927
 Requiem for baritone and mezzosoprano and organ or piano, 1932
 Din Psalmul 102 (Psalm 102) for voice and piano, 1941
 Din Psalmul 104 (Psalm 104) for voice and piano, 1941
 Priceasnă (Prayer) for voice and piano, 1944
 Acum, slobozeşte în pace... (Luke 2:19-35) for voice and piano, 1944
 Cine este-acesta care vine din Edom? (Isaiah 63) for voice and piano, 1952

Choral music 
 Jelige for mixed chorus a cappella, text by Zoltán Szőnyi, 1930
 Apotheosis for mixed chorus, 2 trumpets and piano, text by József Bajza, 1930
 Prietenia între popoare for men's chorus and orchestra, text by Bretan, 1951
 L'hymne olympique (Imn olimpic) for mixed chorus and orchestra, French translation of text by Pindar (Romanian text by Bretan), 1954
 Cântec pentru prietenia Româno-Maghiară for mixed chorus and orchestra, text by Bretan, undated

Instrumental music 
 Mic Dans Românesc (Little Romanian Dance) for orchestra, 1922
 Danse de Polichinelle for piano, 1929
 Waltz for piano, 1930
 Vals Românesc for piano, 1930
 Vals Românesc Nr. 2 for piano, 1930
 Induló / Marş for piano, 1947
 Serenadă for violin and piano, 1955
 Prelude for orchestra, undated

References 

Romanian music
Performing arts in Romania
Eastern European music
Compositions by Nicolae Bretan